Jalaleddin Alimohammadi (born June 15, 1990) is an Iranian football attacking midfielder who plays for Sepahan in the Persian Gulf Pro League.

References

External links

1990 births
Living people
Iranian footballers
Association football forwards
Sepahan S.C. footballers
Sepahan Novin players
Iran under-20 international footballers
Gostaresh Foulad F.C. players
Persian Gulf Pro League players
Sportspeople from Gilan province